Edmund Henry Lushington (11 July 1766 – 27 March 1839) was the second Chief Justice of Ceylon.

He was the son of Rev James Lushington of Rodmersham, Kent and his wife Mary Law, the daughter of Edmund Law, Bishop of Carlisle.

He became a Barrister-at-Law and a Bencher of the Inner Temple. In 1806 he was appointed a Puisne Judge in Ceylon. He was elevated to Chief Justice of Ceylon in 1807, serving until 1809, when he was succeeded by William Coke as acting Chief Justice.

On his return to England he served as Chief Commissioner of the Colonial Audit Board and Master of the Crown Office. In 1824 he was elected a Fellow of the Royal Society.

He died in 1839. He had married twice; firstly Louisa, the daughter of Faulkner Philips of Manchester (died 1801) and secondly Sophia , daughter of Thomas Philips of Sedgeley near Manchester. He had 8 daughters and 4 sons, including Sir Franklin Lushington and Henry Lushington.

References

1766 births
1839 deaths
Sri Lankan people of British descent
Alumni of Queens' College, Cambridge
Fellows of Queens' College, Cambridge
British Ceylon judges
Puisne Justices of the Supreme Court of Ceylon
Chief Justices of British Ceylon
British expatriates in Sri Lanka
19th-century British people
19th-century Sri Lankan people
Fellows of the Royal Society